Amber Lynn (born Laura Lynn Allen; September 3, 1964) is an American pornographic film actress and mainstream actress, radio host, model,  exotic dancer, advocate and humanitarian.

Early life 
Lynn was born Laura Lynn Allen in Orange, California, the youngest daughter of a retired Air Force officer. She has four brothers and an older sister who died at the age of two from an undetected heart defect. When Lynn was three, her parents divorced after it was discovered her father had a family with another woman. Shortly after, Lynn's mother suffered a nervous breakdown, and Lynn was placed in foster care, where she was physically
abused. She was reunited with her mother when she was seven. Shortly after, the two of them were involved in a car accident on the interstate; Lynn was thrown clear of the car and her mother died at the scene.

Lynn and her brothers were placed with her father and his new family; in total there were eight boys and Lynn in the house. When Lynn was eleven, her father died of alcoholism and heart failure. As a teenager, Lynn self-described her change as going from "pudgy kind of bucktoothed" tomboy to a "rocking little body". She started doing fitness modeling, bikini modeling, and hot body contests. She relocated to Hollywood and became a regular at the clubs on Sunset Strip.

Career 
Lynn was a bikini and figure model in Los Angeles in the early 1980s; following this she was featured in nude magazine photo spreads for Penthouse, Hustler, Chic, High Society and Club magazines. Lynn made the transition from nude modeling to pornographic films with an appearance in Bobby Hollander's 1983 feature Personal Touch 3 in a scene with Craig Roberts, and in the video "Vixens In Heat"  release date= December 1983  In 1983, shortly after her photo spread appeared in Penthouse magazine, she went to an audition for a movie where the director was a well-known porn veteran. There, in an effort to calm her nervousness, the director offered Lynn a pipe with some freebase cocaine. It was her first encounter with the drug; she later described the feeling of being as "It's as if the birds are singing. The light is brighter. All of a sudden I'm no longer this gangly nervous teenager. I'm sitting there going 'Oh wow!. She has been clean and sober since 2000 and works in the detox of addicts and alcoholics at times.

Lynn was the first female performer to open the door for adult film stars to be featured in dance touring, being recognized for this accomplishment throughout the United States and Canada.  Lynn was the highest paid female performer on the strip club circuit, making $32,000 a week. Lynn was paid 20,000 to appear Sin City Entertainment's 1995 Baywatch Parody "Babewatch" 3 & 4, 10 times more than Pamela Anderson's own claim she only made $1500 per day for NBC's Baywatch television series, Ms. Lynn's marketability was thus strong. IMDb
 
Lynn has had roles in non-adult films such as Evils of the Night (1985) and 52 Pick-Up (1986), and in the television program The Man Show and guest starred as herself in Lionsgate's Who's Jenna...? (2018), she was featured as Michael Douglas character’s "Fantasy Lady" in The Kominsky Method (2019), and appeared in the documentary Larry Flynt for President (2021)
For her 28th birthday in 1992, Lynn hosted a benefit birthday party at the Bel Age hotel in Beverly Hills. The benefit was in honor of The Youth AIDS Foundation of Los Angeles, an organization providing housing and assistance for helping runaways get off the streets and for teenagers with HIV, which was about to go under. An August 1992 issue of the Los Angeles Times quoted her statement on page two: "Let's give them food, clothing and shelter and we'll worry about role models later", alongside a shot of her dressed in a formal gown, holding an infant girl. This was a breakthrough moment for how the adult industry was viewed by the mainstream concerning its crossover involvement in children's organizations, as never before had a children's organization knowingly accepted support from the adult entertainment industry.

Lynn has opposed the Los Angeles "Safer Sex in the Adult-Film Industry" initiative, which mandates that actors in adult films shot in Los Angeles County use condoms. She has been involved in the first charity to accept contributions from the adult film industry, Youth AIDS Foundation of Los Angeles, since 1992. She has served as the Sergeant at Arms for APAG Union The Adult Performance Actors Guild a federally recognized union serving artists, and talent in the industry since 2016. She also helps other charities such as Rock Against MS, ACLU, CHLA Children's Hospital Los Angeles, Childhood Cancer Awareness, The Southern California Toy Run and Janie's Fund, Steven Tyler's new organization.

Lynn hosts a weekly TV media podcast talk show called Rock'N'SeXXXy UnCensored on United Broadcasting Network, rock-n-sexxxy-uncensored.com, formerly LATalkRadio.com and Stitcher.com. She is a member of the Adult Video News (AVN) Hall of Fame and was awarded a Lifetime Achievement Award from the Free Speech Coalition. She continues to perform as an adult actress.

 Personal life 
Amber Lynn is the sister of porn actor Buck Adams. Lynn met porn actor Jamie Gillis on the set of her second-ever pornographic film, and the two began a long-term relationship.

Lynn had her first experience with cocaine on a porn set very early in her career. She eventually became addicted to cocaine, a drug addiction that lasted for nearly two decades. She once said, "I started out drinking Ketel One and slicing off crystals of Peruvian rock. I wound up broken down, drinking Kamchatka Vodka out of a half-pint stashed in the bottom of my purse, with my crack pipe stuffed in the lining of my jacket". She has been clean and sober since 2000, and occasionally works as a personal recovery assistant, helping addicts to detox. She also works in mainstream acting roles, as a webcam model on one of the largest cam sites online, and as a real estate agent specializing in luxury homes.

 Notable TV guest appearances 
 The Man Show – "Hypnotist" (episode 2.20) February 4, 2001
 Frontline – "Death of a Porn Queen", June 1987
 CBS - "Adult film performers say the state of mental health in the industry needs more attention", December 2019

 Awards 
 1987 XRCO Award – Best Supporting Actress – Taboo 5'' 
 1993 Hot d'Or – Lifetime Achievement Award
 1996 XRCO Hall of Fame inductee
 2001 AVN Hall of Fame inductee
 2003 Free Speech Coalition – Lifetime Achievement Award
 2007 Adam Film World Guide – Lifetime Achievement Award

References

External links 

 
 
 
 
 

1964 births
American female erotic dancers
American erotic dancers
American female adult models
American pornographic film actresses
Living people
Pornographic film actors from California
20th-century American actresses
21st-century American actresses
Webcam models